Ezequiel Ignacio Centurión (born 20 May 1997) is an Argentine professional footballer who plays as a goalkeeper for River Plate.

Career
Centurión is a youth product of Pillmatún, Cipolletti, and Fernández Oro before moving to River Plate's academy in 2014. He began as their fourth goalkeeper and first appeared as reserve goalkeeper for the senior side in 2018. He went on loan with Estudiantes Caseros for the 2021 season. He made his professional debut with Estudiantes Caseros in a 2–1 Primera Nacional loss to Almirante Brown on 13 March 2021. He returned to River Plate after his loan spell, again acting as backup goalkeeper.

International career
Centurión was called up to represent the Argentina U23s for a set of friendlies in September 2019.

References

External links
 
 River Plate Profile
 

1997 births
Living people
People from Cipolletti
Argentine footballers
Argentina youth international footballers
Association football midfielders
Club Atlético River Plate footballers
Estudiantes de Buenos Aires footballers
Primera Nacional players